In the history of astronomy, a handful of Solar System bodies have been counted as the fifth planet from the Sun. Under the present definition of a planet, Jupiter is counted as the fifth.

Hypotheses 
There are three main ideas regarding hypothetical planets between Mars and Jupiter.

Asteroids 
During the early 19th century, as asteroids were discovered, they were considered planets. Jupiter became the sixth planet with the discovery of Ceres in 1801. Soon, three more asteroids, Pallas (1802), Juno (1804), and Vesta (1807) were discovered. They were counted as separate planets, despite the fact that they share a single orbital spacing given by Titius–Bode law. Between 1845 and 1851, eleven additional asteroids were discovered and Jupiter had become the twentieth planet. At this point, astronomers began to classify asteroids as minor planets. Following the reclassification of the asteroids in their own group, Jupiter became the fifth planet once again. With the redefinition of the term planet in August 2006, Ceres is now considered a dwarf planet.

Disruption theory 

The disruption theory suggests that a planet which was positioned between Mars and Jupiter was destroyed, resulting in the asteroid belt between these planets. Scientists in the 20th century dubbed this hypothetical planet "Phaeton". Today, the Phaeton hypothesis, superseded by the accretion model, has been discarded by the scientific community; however, some fringe scientists regard this theory as credible and even likely.

Planet V theory 

Based on simulations, NASA space scientists John Chambers and Jack J. Lissauer have proposed the existence of a planet between Mars and the asteroid belt, going in a successively eccentric and unstable orbit, 4 billion years ago. They connect this planet, which they name Planet V, and its disappearance with the Late Heavy Bombardment episode of the Hadean era. Chambers and Lissauer also claim this Planet V most probably ended up crashing into the Sun. Unlike the disruption theory's fifth planet, "Planet V" is not credited with creating the asteroid belt.

Fifth planet in fiction 

The concept of a fifth planet which had been destroyed to make the asteroid belt, as in the Disruption Theory, has been a popular one in fiction.

See also 

 Disrupted planet
 Hypothetical planetary object
 
 Planets beyond Neptune
 Trans-Neptunian object
 Trans-Neptunian objects in fiction

Notes

References 
 

Ancient astronomy
Early scientific cosmologies
Hypothetical bodies of the Solar System
Hypothetical planets
Ceres (dwarf planet)